Kathleen Ann "Kathy" McGahey (born March 5, 1960 in Philadelphia, Pennsylvania) is a former field hockey player from the United States, who was a member of the Women's National Team that won the bronze medal at the 1984 Summer Olympics in Los Angeles, California.

References
 databaseOlympics

External links
 

1960 births
Living people
American female field hockey players
Field hockey players at the 1984 Summer Olympics
Olympic bronze medalists for the United States in field hockey
Place of birth missing (living people)
Medalists at the 1984 Summer Olympics
21st-century American women